Nándor János Dáni (born 2 July 1871 in Budapest, Austria-Hungary; died 31 December 1949 in Budapest, Hungary) was a Hungarian athlete. He competed at the 1896 Summer Olympics in Athens.

Dáni competed in the 800 metres, taking second place in his preliminary heat to advance to the final.  There, he again finished behind Edwin Flack of Australia, the same runner who had beaten him in the first round.  Dáni's time in the final was 2:11.8, less than a second behind Flack's 2:11.0 time.

References

External links

1871 births
1949 deaths
Athletes from Budapest
Hungarian male middle-distance runners
Olympic athletes of Hungary
Athletes (track and field) at the 1896 Summer Olympics
19th-century sportsmen
Olympic silver medalists for Hungary
Medalists at the 1896 Summer Olympics
Olympic silver medalists in athletics (track and field)